You Exist Too Much is a debut novel by Zaina Arafat, published June 9, 2020 by Catapult. The book won the Lambda Literary Award for Bisexual Fiction in 2021.

Reception 
You Exist Too Much received positive reviews from the Los Angeles Review of Books, The San Francisco Book Review, Washington Independent Review of Books, NPR, The Irish Times, and Publishers Weekly.

NPR's Gabino Iglesias wrote that You Exist Too Much is "a perfect example of how culture and family can affect those whose lives span different realities."

Sarah Mills, writing for the Los Angeles Review of Books, called it "[a]n unpretentious read," saying, "[W]hat the novel lacks in richness and layers, it makes up for in accessibility and honesty, steering clear of the stereotypes that so often plague characters from a Middle Eastern background."

The Washington Independent Review's Antoaneta Tileva said it is "an engrossing character study of a young, bisexual Palestinian American woman. Much more than an exploration of intersecting lines and identities, the debut novel revels in their clouding."

Kirkus, The Washington Post, New York Times Book Review, and Booklist provided mixed reviews.

Kirkus called the book "uneven," a sentiment echoed in Publishers Weekly's review, though they agreed the novel was "intriguing."

Booklist's Terry Hong said, "Debuting novelist Arafat’s damaged cast might resonate with untethered millennials, but utmost patience is a must."

In 2021, You Exist Too Much won the Lambda Literary Award for Bisexual Fiction.

References 

2020s LGBT novels
Novels with bisexual themes
Lambda Literary Award-winning works